Manjinqan (also Romanized as Manjīnqān; also known as Manjeghan, Manjeqān, Menjqān, and Minjgān) is a village in Duzaj Rural District, Kharqan District, Zarandieh County, Markazi Province, Iran. At the 2006 census, its population was 287, in 76 families.

References 

Populated places in Zarandieh County